Myrrhis odorata, with common names cicely, sweet cicely, myrrh, garden myrrh, and sweet chervil, is a herbaceous perennial plant belonging to the celery family Apiaceae. It is the only species in the genus Myrrhis.

Etymology
The genus name Myrrhis derives from the Greek word myrrhis [μυρρίς], an aromatic oil from Asia. The Latin species name odorata means scented.

Description
 Myrrhis odorata is a tall herbaceous perennial plant growing to 2 m [6 ft 6 in] tall, depending on circumstances. The leaves are fern-like, 2-4-pinnate, finely divided, feathery, up to 50 cm long, with whitish patches near the rachis. The plant is softly hairy and smells strongly of aniseed when crushed. The flowers are creamy-white, about 2–4 mm across, produced in large umbels. The flowering period extends from May to June. The fruits are slender, dark brown, 15–25 mm long and 3–4 mm broad.

Distribution and habitat
Myrrhis odorata is native to mountains of southern and central Europe, from the Pyrenees to the Caucasus. It has been introduced and naturalized elsewhere in cultivated areas, woodland margins, roadside verges, river banks and grassland. In the British Isles it is most abundant in northern England and eastern Scotland.

Cultivation and uses
In fertile soils it grows readily from seed, and may be increased by division in spring or autumn.

Its leaves are sometimes used as a herb, either raw or cooked, with a rather strong taste reminiscent of anise. The roots and seeds also are edible. Additionally, it has a history of use as a medicinal herb.

Like its relatives anise, fennel, and caraway, it can also be used to flavour akvavit. Its essential oils are dominated by anethole.

References

Edible Apiaceae
Herbs
Apioideae